Wilhelm Amsinck Burchard-Motz (born 4 July 1878 in Hamburg, died 13 January 1963 in Hamburg) was a German lawyer and national-liberal politician. He served as Senator for Trade, Shipping and Industry of Hamburg from 1925 to 1933 and as Second Mayor from 1933 to 1934.  Burchard-Motz was a member of the Nazi Party.

He was the son of Hamburg First Mayor Johann Heinrich Burchard and Emily Amsinck. Following studies in Heidelberg, Lausanne and Cambridge, he worked as lawyer in Hamburg from 1904 where he was a member of the Esche Schümann Commichau (chambers, as in association of barristers).

In the 1950s, he was Vice President of the German Golf Association.

References

External ink

Senators of Hamburg
Grand burghers of Hamburg
1878 births
1963 deaths
Lawyers in the Nazi Party
Jurists from Hamburg